Chikushi can refer to:

Chikushi Station in Kyushu, Japan
6237 Chikushi, an asteroid